Thomas Lancaster (11 February 1863 – 12 December 1935) was an English cricketer who played first-class cricket for Lancashire from 1894 to 1899.

References

1863 births
1935 deaths
Cricketers from Huddersfield
English cricketers
Lancashire cricketers
English cricketers of 1890 to 1918